Saint Swithun has appeared many times in popular culture.

 Frank Sinatra provided advice to "reluctant pop star" George Michael and referenced St. Swithin's Day in his letter.
The 1981 song "Night of the Vampire" by Roky Erickson references the titular vampire as having been born on St. Swithin's Day.
The last thing that Jane Austen wrote was a poem about the Winchester races, which features Saint Swithin as the antagonist of the race attendees. She has the saint say, "Oh, subjects rebellious, Oh Venta depraved/ When once we are buried you think we are dead/ But behold me Immortal. --By vice you're enslaved/ You have sinn'd & must suffer...Ye cannot but know my command o'er July,/ Henceforward I'll triumph in shewing my powers,/ Shift your race as you will it shall never be dry/ The curse upon Venta is July in showers." Jane Austen died three days after writing this poem, and was shortly thereafter buried in St. Swithin's Cathedral, Winchester. 
 "St Swithin's Day", a song by Billy Bragg from the 1984 album Brewing Up with Billy Bragg
 Bart refers to “St Swithin’s Day” in a play he wrote in “Bart of Darkness,” Season 6, Episode 1 of The Simpsons.
 "St. Swithun's" is the Wayne Foundation funded orphanage that raised the orphan patrollman John Blake in the film "The Dark Knight Rises". The naming of an orphanage after St. Swithun is a reference to his restoring "broken eggs" in regards to "broken children".

References

Cultural depictions of religious leaders
Cultural depictions of British men
Celebrities in popular culture